Plataea ursaria is a species of geometrid moth in the family Geometridae. It is found in North America.

The MONA or Hodges number for Plataea ursaria is 6923.

References

Further reading

 

Ourapterygini
Articles created by Qbugbot
Moths described in 1922